Kastelholm Castle is a Swedish-built medieval castle located off Road 2 in Sund, Åland, Finland, approximately  northeast of Mariehamn, overlooking a fjord to the south of the village of Kastelholm. Along with Hämeenlinna, Olavinlinna in Savonlinna, Raseborg, and Turku, Kastelholm is one of only five surviving Finnish medieval fortresses that are also considered to be architecturally substantial. Built in the 14th century, and held in fief during the Middle Ages by various nobles, feudal chiefs, and kings, it had significant period in the 15th and 16th centuries.

Built in the 14th century, originally on a small island surrounded by moats filled with water and planted with several rows of poles, the castle has been of strategic importance in consolidating Swedish authority over the Baltic over the last several centuries; with several Swedish monarchs parading through the history. It was first damaged in the 1599 civil war when it came under the control of King Charles IX and was rebuilt by 1631. The castle was gutted and ruined in 1745. In the 1930s, it was partially used as a granary. However, since then it has been refurbished and is now an important part of the tourist circuit in Åland.

History
Construction began in the 1380s on the castle's southern side. It was first mentioned in 1388 in the contract of Queen Margaret I of Denmark, where a large portion of the inheritance of Bo Jonsson Grip, the castle's first occupier, was given to the queen. The mansus unit rŏk, a taxation term, was first introduced during the 14th century for the maintenance of the castle.

The heyday of the castle was in the 15th and 16th centuries. In 1433, then owned by lady Ida Königsmarck, it was under siege during the Engelbrecht rebellion. When Niels Eriksen Gyldenstjerne, Danish Steward of the Realm during the period of 1453–1456, received the Kastelholm fief in 1485, he did so with the understanding that he was "faithfully to build and improve the walls and buildings of the said castle of Kastelholm, which are needful for the said castle, to the benefit and use of the crown of Sweden, as he has promised us willingly to do". Of the several enhancements made to the original construction, one of the most notable was by Gustav Vasa, before he became king of Sweden, who regularly used to hunt on the castle grounds. In fact, the hunting-grounds of the castle's forests were protected by law permitting only the castle's governor and the king to hunt there.

Kastelholm developed a shipyard employing 50 shipwrights in the 16th century. However, in 1505 the Danish naval officer Søren Norby captured the castle from the Swedes. The presence of Gypsies in Finland is first mentioned in the castle's record books in 1559.
John III of Sweden kept his deposed brother Eric XIV in captivity in the castle in the Fall of 1571. At that time (1568-1621) the castle was the fief of queen dowager Catherine Stenbock, a political enemy of her stepson, Eric XIV.  With the help of cannons, the castle was damaged severely when the forces of king Charles IX of Sweden conquered it from queen dowager Catherine in the 1599 civil war, the War against Sigismund.

The damages were repaired by 1631. However, due to a change in the county system, Åland was joined with the County of Åbo and Björneborg at which time Kastelholm lost its status as an administrative centre and its overall importance just three years after the damages were repaired. The Kastelholm witch trials took place here in the 1660s. From the late 17th century began the castle to decay and much of it burned down in an extensive fire in 1745. For a time, it served as a prison but by the 1770s it was abandoned. At some point after 1809, the post office was moved from the castle to the Bomarsund, as was the Russian Commandant's secretariat.

Kastelholm was partly used as a granary for taxation grain and as a quarry for local farmers in the 1930s. A restoration program, advanced from 1982 through 1989, involved archaeological excavations. Today, much of the Kastelhom Castle is reconstructed and since the 1990s has contained the Outdoor Museum Jan Karlsgården.

Architecture

The castle was built on a small island to strengthen the Swedish presence on Åland. The island was surrounded by natural water and moats filled with several lines of poles, while the castle is surrounded by a  wall.

Built of brick and mortar, the castle's original design included a rectangular stone keep and a residential wing. The hall, of later construction, became re-purposed as a granary. The castle includes a chapel; its patron saints are Berard of Carbio and four other  Moroccan martyrs.

Tourism

The castle is a major tourist attraction easily accessible by car from Mariehamn and by bus only on weekdays. Excavated items, such as early stove tiles, are on exhibit in the hall. A medieval festival, replete with dance, food, and jousting occurs each year in July.
The area around and down to Stornäset has become a royal estate with a golf course also available in the area.

Other attractions nearby include the Outdoor Museum Jan Karlsgården, which is next to the castle, and the nearby ruins of Bomarsund, a huge Russian-built naval fortress. The fjord on which the castle is located on is used for sailing and for boating.

Blasting controversy
The castle authorities and the media were under the impression that the vibrations from the blasting would create irreplaceable damage to the foundations of this ancient landmark and given that the castle had been recently renovated internally at the time believed it would cause damage. In the end, experts assessed that the way the vibrations would be distributed would not cause the damage that was anticipated and the blasting went ahead.

References

External links

 Info on Aland Tourist Site
 Info on Aland Museum Website
 Kastelholme Castle at Northern Fortres website

Castles in Finland
History of Åland
Ruins in Finland
Sund, Åland
Forts in Sweden
14th century in Europe
Buildings and structures in Åland
Museums in Åland
Historic house museums in Finland